Drayton is a surname. Notable people with the surname include:

Military
 Percival Drayton (1812–1865), United States Navy officer, son of US Congressman William Drayton of South Carolina
 Thomas Drayton (1809–1899), American Civil War Confederate general, son of US Congressman William Drayton of South Carolina

Performing arts
 Charley Drayton (born 1965), American drummer, multi-instrumentalist, and producer – grandson of jazz bassist Charlie Drayton
 Charlie Drayton (1919–1953), American jazz bassist
 Clay Drayton (born 1947), American songwriter and record producer
 Paul Drayton (composer), English musician
 Poppy Drayton (born 1991), English actress
 Flavor Flav (born William J. Drayton in 1959), American rap artist

Public service and law
 John Drayton (1766–1822), Governor of South Carolina
 Joy Drayton (1916–2012), New Zealand teacher and politician
 William Drayton (1776–1846), American congressman
 William Henry Drayton (1742–1779), American lawyer, South Carolina delegate to Continental Congress
 William Drayton Sr. (1733–1790), American lawyer and judge

Sports
 Jerome Drayton (born 1945), Canadian distance runner
 Maurice Drayton (born 1976), American football coach
 Paul Drayton (athlete) (born 1939), American athlete, gold medal winner at the 1964 Summer Olympics

Other professions 
 Bill Drayton (born 1943), American social entrepreneur and environmentalist
 Dean Drayton (born 1941), Australian church leader
 Michael Drayton (1563–1631), English poet